The 1946 North Dakota gubernatorial election was held on November 5, 1946. Incumbent Republican Fred G. Aandahl defeated Democratic nominee Quentin Burdick with 68.88% of the vote.

Primary elections
Primary elections were held on June 25, 1946.

Democratic primary

Candidates
Quentin Burdick, attorney

Results

Republican primary

Candidates
Fred G. Aandahl, incumbent Governor
Elmer W. Cart, former North Dakota Railroad Commissioner
Lynn Frazier, former United States Senator

Results

General election

Candidates
Fred G. Aandahl, Republican 
Quentin Burdick, Democratic

Results

References

1946
North Dakota
Gubernatorial